Olivier Lasak (born 28 March 1967 in Béthune) is a French sprint canoeist who competed in the late 1980s and early 1990s. At the 1988 Summer Olympics in Seoul, he was eliminated in the semifinals of the K-2 500 m event. Four years later, Lasak was eliminated in the semifinals of the same event.

References
 Sports-Reference.com profile

1967 births
Canoeists at the 1988 Summer Olympics
Canoeists at the 1992 Summer Olympics
French male canoeists
Living people
Olympic canoeists of France
Sportspeople from Pas-de-Calais
20th-century French people